La Laguna (also known until recently as Tajuya de abajo or La Laguna de Tajuya) is a town and neighbourhood of Los Llanos de Aridane, in La Palma, Canary Islands, Spain. It was significantly affected by a lava flow from the 2021 Cumbre Vieja volcanic eruption, which destroyed hundreds of houses in the town.

History  
The town was also known as "Tajuya de abajo" or "La Laguna de Tajuya", with historical references going back to the 17th century.

Description 
The town center is marked by the "Venta de Doña Rosario", a canopy named after a pond that formed nearby when it rained. The neighbourhood does not have many historic buildings; it is known more for the local agriculture, which has changed over the years from sugarcane, to tomato, to banana and avocado, with many small plots owned by locals.

It has a parish church dedicated to San Isidro, construction of which started in June 1966, funded by local donations, and significant contributions from local women.

As of 2020, it had 1645 inhabitants.

Culture 
It has been described as one of the more traditional Los Llanos neighbourhoods. It holds a festival in May called "La Patrona chica", a prelude to Our Lady of Los Remedios festivities in Los Llanos. It had a school since 1875. It was the location of the founding of the Velia Cultural Society in 1932.

Volcanic eruption 
The town was affected by the 2021 Cumbre Vieja volcanic eruption, with the town's football field, as well as a nearby supermarket and other buildings, consumed by lava on the 14th October 2021. The town had been partially evacuated a few days earlier, which was followed by a complete evacuation of the town. A filling station, followed by the school, and hundreds of houses in the town were destroyed by the lava flow shortly afterwards.

References 

Populated places in La Palma